Avirmediin Enkhee (born 25 June 1961) is a Mongolian wrestler. He competed in the men's freestyle 62 kg at the 1988 Summer Olympics.

References

External links
 

1961 births
Living people
Mongolian male sport wrestlers
Olympic wrestlers of Mongolia
Wrestlers at the 1988 Summer Olympics
Place of birth missing (living people)
Wrestlers at the 1982 Asian Games
Asian Games competitors for Mongolia
21st-century Mongolian people
20th-century Mongolian people